The Rev-9 is a fictional character and the main antagonist of Terminator: Dark Fate, the sixth installment in the Terminator series. In its human form, the Rev-9 is portrayed by Gabriel Luna.

History
The Rev-9 is a Terminator model developed by Legion, an artificial intelligence designed for cyber warfare in a future timeline where Skynet's rise was prevented. Legion dispatched a Rev-9 back in time to 2020 from 2042 with the mission of terminating Dani Ramos, a young woman who will go on to lead humanity against Legion's forces in the future. Upon its arrival in Mexico City, the Rev-9 goes to Dani's home, only to find that she and her brother Diego have already left for their job at a factory. It kills their father and assumes his appearance as a disguise to infiltrate the factory. There, it nearly shoots Dani, but is ambushed by Grace, a cybernetically-enhanced human soldier sent from 2042 to protect her. The Rev-9 pursues them in a truck as they escape, and during the chase reveals its capability to split into two individual units. It manages to kill Diego and corner Dani and Grace, only to be temporarily disabled by the sudden arrival of Sarah Connor, who attacks it using high-grade weaponry. Dani and Grace flee, and later meet up with Sarah.

Having lost its targets, the Rev-9 hacks into local surveillance cameras to reacquire them. It discovers the trio are heading to Laredo, Texas, where inevitably they would need to cross the Mexico–United States border. Disguising itself as a United States Border Patrol officer, it arranges their arrest, so that it can ambush them. The Rev-9 arrives at the Border Patrol detention center in Laredo and slaughters numerous Border Patrol agents and detainees but the trio escapes in a helicopter. By the time it is able to locate them again, they have allied with Carl, a T-800 Terminator left behind after Skynet's demise.

The Rev-9 catches up with its targets at a military base where they seek to acquire electromagnetic pulse (EMP) grenades to use against it. In the ensuing battle, the EMP grenades are damaged, while Dani and her allies escape in a military aircraft. The Rev-9 gives chase in a hijacked aircraft of its own, and manages to board theirs, leading to both Carl and the Rev-9 crashing into a river near a hydroelectric power plant while Dani, Sarah and Grace parachute to safety. Although slowed down in the river's current, it catches up with them inside the plant, where they decide to take a stand against it. As they fight the Rev-9, Carl and Grace managed to restrain it and force it into a turbine, causing an explosion that mortally wounds Grace and temporarily disables Carl and Sarah. The explosion also destroys the Rev-9's liquid metal exterior, but its severely damaged endoskeleton continues pursuing Dani, who tries to use Grace's power source as an EMP against it, only to be held down and nearly killed until Carl reactivates and holds it back. Once Dani stabs the power source into the Rev-9's endoskeleton, Carl drags it into a nearby pit, where the device's discharge melts both Terminators, destroying them.

Background

The Rev-9 is portrayed by Gabriel Luna, who began a four-month casting process in December 2017. Rev-9 is an advanced machine sent from the future by Legion (an AI that succeeded Skynet after the timeline alteration following the events of Terminator 2: Judgment Day) from the year 2042 to terminate a woman named Dani Ramos, among others. Rev-9 has a traditional solid endoskeleton covered with a liquid-metal exoskeleton, somewhat similarly to the T-X from Terminator 3: Rise of the Machines and is considered a combination of the T-800 and the T-1000. The Rev-9 possesses the ability to fully split these two components into two separate, fully autonomous units. The separation does not significantly weaken either unit, making the Rev-9 one of the most formidable Terminator models yet seen (Its ability to take punishment is slightly lessened when the two are separate, but this only means that it is easier to throw the Rev-9 back or slow it down rather than actually destroying it). Its poly-alloy and endoskeleton can separate and fuse back together at a rapid pace, enabling it to split or merge during combat without ceasing its movements. Director Tim Miller commented on this upgrade, telling CinemaCon attendees, "Our cool new feature... is he can split. So, he's twice as deadly." However, the Rev-9 is at its strongest when it is one unit.

Miller wanted the character to be "lethal and capable, but not so lethal that our heroes don't stand a chance to fight against him," saying, "You want to have some limits and you don't want him to have plasma weapons, or ones that explode like a nuclear bomb, which would mean the movie will be over quickly." Eventually, the filmmakers decided on a Terminator character that would essentially have a combination of the T-800's endoskeleton and the T-1000's liquid metal skin. The Rev-9 is shown to have a deeper personality than Arnold Schwarzenegger's T-800 character. Miller said the Rev-9 "is not some cold machine that has a limited personality like Arnold was. He is a fully featured character. He's more human than human, and if it's easier to charm his way past an obstacle versus kill it, stab it or break it down, he'll do that." For example, in the film, the Rev-9 tries to convince the other characters to let him kill Dani, implying that he will show them mercy and let them go if they do, and tries to use logic to coerce the T-800 into joining him, stating that they were both built for the purpose of ending humanity. During an earlier encounter with cops in Texas, it assumes a southern accent to blend in.

Luna analyzed the first two Terminator films for guidance on how to portray the Rev-9. His portrayal was also inspired by Ted Bundy and by Tom Cruise's assassin character in the 2004 film Collateral. Luna explained "[We] certainly wanted to honor everything that had come before. There's no reason to remake the wheel when it's running so smoothly and seems to scare the pants off everybody. [We wanted to] find what worked really well (...) but I think that they wanted him to have a charming quality, an approachable quality. You know, the fact that Ted Bundy could walk up to you in a park and all of a sudden, you're gone. That always was there." Luna also underwent physical training and fight choreography to prepare for the role.

Luna said that the Rev-9's ability to learn and simulate human emotion ultimately becomes the character's weakness, stating that the Rev-9 grows frustrated with its failed attempts to kill Dani. As a result, it becomes increasingly focused on her while somewhat ignoring the other characters who come after it during the film's final battle. Luna said that scenes were cut from the final film which would have further developed the character's personality and frustration.

Dave Trumbore of Collider speculated that the Rev-9's name may have been inspired by the Biblical verse of Revelation 9, which mentions "the Destroyer." Another possibility is that it stands for "Revision 9," marking it as the ninth attempt to create such a Terminator model. Chris Klimek of Slate believed that the Rev-9, in its disguise as a villainous Border Patrol agent, was meant as an allegory on immigration issues between the U.S. and Mexico.

Abilities
The Rev-9's primary feature is the ability to split its liquid metal exterior and endoskeleton into two separate units. In addition to this, it possesses similar basic capabilities to the Terminators created by Skynet before its destruction. Like the T-1000 it is capable of shapeshifting to assume the appearance of anyone it touches and can morph its arms to form stabbing weapons and other shapes, such as hooks for scaling vertical surfaces. The Rev-9 exhibits more control over its composition than the T-1000, allowing it to use its polyalloy in more inventive and adaptive fashions. The endoskeleton is also shown to adjust its physical form to bend in an inhuman manner. The Rev-9 is also a skilled acrobat, able to make great leaps and climb treacherous surfaces with ease. The Rev-9 is composed of carbon-based alloy, making it lighter and stronger than previous Terminators. The Rev-9 can adapt behavioral responses (such as emotions) similarly to the T-800, either by choice or impulse, and its exterior can quickly heal itself after taking an injury, like the T-1000. The Rev-9 is able to tap into servers and rapidly gain large amounts of information. Luna said that this ability allows the Rev-9 to do "very quickly what it took the T-800 decades to achieve." Once connected to computer systems, it can control other machines linked to them such as drones as well as communications, essentially a computer virus that invades other programs and inserts its own code.
 
When the Rev-9 is separated into two units, its liquid metal form continues using a human disguise, while the other part takes the appearance of a metallic endoskeleton.

See also
 Nanotechnology in fiction
 Programmable matter
 Self-assembly of nanoparticles

References

External links
 

Terminator (franchise) characters
Fictional amorphous creatures
Fictional androids
Fictional assassins
Fictional characters who can move at superhuman speeds
Fictional characters with accelerated healing
Fictional characters with superhuman durability or invulnerability
Fictional characters with superhuman strength
Fictional computer viruses
Fictional mass murderers
Fictional super soldiers
Film characters introduced in 2019
Nanotechnology in fiction
Science fiction weapons
Time travelers
Film supervillains
Robot supervillains